Felix Meskens (14 November 1906 – 10 January 1973) was a Belgian long-distance runner. He competed in the marathon at the 1936 Summer Olympics.

References

1906 births
1973 deaths
Athletes (track and field) at the 1936 Summer Olympics
Belgian male long-distance runners
Belgian male marathon runners
Olympic athletes of Belgium
Place of birth missing